Yan Zhichan (born May 1964) is a Chinese politician who serves as a committee member on in the National Congress of the Communist Party of China. She is serving as a member of the Standing Committee of Guangxi Party Committee. She formerly served as a member of the Anhui Provincial Party Committee, the Director of its Organization Department, and the Director of the United Front Work Department of Guangdong Province.

Early life
Yan was born in Yangchun, Yangjiang, Guangdong province in 1964. After completing her Bachelor's of Law and Master's in Management at Sun Yat-sen University in 1985 she joined the Communist Party of China to work at the Ministry of Education.

Political career
From 2003 to 2007 Yan was a member of the CPC Zhanjiang Municipal Party Committee and later became its deputy secretary in 2008. That same year she was promoted to become the committee's main secretary. Three years later she was made deputy party secretary of the Guangdong Provincial Department of Justice.

In 2015 Yan was elected the Party Secretary of Jieyang and later became a committee party member of Guangdong Province as part of the United Front Work Department. In 2017 she became a member of the 19th Central Committee of the Communist Party of China.

In 2017, Yan was appointed as a member of the Anhui Provincial Party Committee, and the Director of its Organization Department.

In 2018, Yan was appointed as a member of the Standing Committee of Guangxi Party Committee.

In March 2020, Yan was appointed to serve as the Deputy director of the Macau Liaison Office.

References

Living people
1956 births
Chinese women in politics
Politicians from Yangjiang
Chinese Communist Party politicians from Guangdong
People's Republic of China politicians from Guangdong
Alternate members of the 19th Central Committee of the Chinese Communist Party
Political office-holders in Guangdong
Political office-holders in Anhui
Political office-holders in Guangxi